The Keeline Building is located at 319 South 17th Street in downtown Omaha, Nebraska. Completed in 1911 just before construction of the neighboring Douglas County Courthouse was completed, the seven-story Keeline was designed by locally renowned architect John Latenser, Sr. The Keeline is built in the Georgian Revival style, said to represent "the prosperous commercial development in Omaha during this period." In 2010 the building was sold to KMC Properties LLC, of Council Bluffs, Iowa.

References

National Register of Historic Places in Omaha, Nebraska
Office buildings in Omaha, Nebraska
Office buildings completed in 1911
John Latenser Sr. buildings
Commercial buildings on the National Register of Historic Places in Nebraska
1911 establishments in Nebraska